Keith Fraser, is a former British police officer, with a career spanning more than 30 years, who is the current Chair of the Youth Justice Board.

Background
Fraser was born in Birmingham, England, the son of a bus driver and a secretary who migrated to Britain from Jamaica in the 1960s.

Career 
Fraser began working for the Metropolitan Police in 1985 and in 2005 joined West Midlands Police, where he rose through the ranks to become by the time of his retirement in 2017 the only serving black Superintendent in the force. 

Fraser was appointed Chair of the Youth Justice Board (YJB) on 14 April 2020 by the Lord Chancellor and Secretary of State for Justice, Robert Buckland.

In 2020-21 he served as a commissioner on the UK Government's Commission on Race and Ethnic Disparities.

References 

Living people
Year of birth missing (living people)
British people of Jamaican descent
People from Birmingham, West Midlands